Henry Elax Reed Jr. (born January 15, 1948) is a former American football defensive end who played four seasons with the New York Giants of the National Football League (NFL). He was drafted by the Giants in the tenth round of the 1971 NFL Draft. He first enrolled at Iowa Central Community College before transferring to Weber State University. Reed attended Northwestern High School in Detroit, Michigan.

References

External links
Just Sports Stats

Living people
1948 births
Players of American football from Detroit
American football defensive ends
Iowa Central Tritons football players
Weber State Wildcats football players
New York Giants players
Northwestern High School (Michigan) alumni